Bleed for This is a 2016 American biographical sports film written and directed by Ben Younger and based on the life of former world champion boxer Vinny Pazienza. The film stars Miles Teller as Pazienza, with Aaron Eckhart, Katey Sagal, Ciarán Hinds, and Ted Levine in supporting roles.

The film had its world premiere at the 43rd Annual Telluride Film Festival on September 2, 2016, and was released in the United States on November 18, 2016, by Open Road Films.

Plot
In November 1988, Vinny Pazienza boxes Roger Mayweather for the WBC World Light Welterweight Title. He arrives late to the weigh-in, as he has been riding a stationary bicycle in order to make the weight limit. Vinny's final weight is 140 pounds even, which qualifies him for the fight.

Instead of resting up for the fight, Vinny spends the night at a casino. The following day, he loses to Mayweather. At one point during the fight, Vinny  is hit after the bell. His boxing manager Lou Duva causes a scene by going after Mayweather, but is punched as a result. Following the match, Duva tells the media that Vinny should retire from boxing. This angers Vinny's father Angelo (who serves as his coach), and he confronts Duva. In the ensuing argument, Vinny announces that he wants another fight, and hires Kevin Rooney as his coach.

Angelo receives confirmation that Vinny has been granted a title fight against Gilbert Dele. Vinny wins the bout via technical knockout, which makes him the WBA World Light Middleweight champion. Some days later, Angelo tells Vinny that he will be fighting Panamanian boxer Roberto Durán. Vinny is pleased, and gets in a car with his friend Jimmy to get some coffee. On the way, they are hit head-on by an oncoming car. Jimmy sustains minor injuries, but Vinny suffers a critical neck injury. As he regains consciousness in the hospital, the doctor informs him that he might never walk again, and will certainly never fight again. He offers to better Vinny's chances of walking by performing a spinal fusion. While this would guarantee that he can walk again, it would limit movement in his neck. Thus, boxing would be out of the question. Against his doctor's recommendation, Vinny opts to be fitted with a Halo, a medical device in which a circular metal brace is screwed into the skull in four spots, and propped up with four metal rods. This would allow him to regain movement in his neck, which could allow him to box again. Despite Vinny's optimism, the notion is rejected by Rooney.

Disobeying his doctors' advice, Vinny begins to work out in his basement. He tells Rooney, who agrees to help him. Angelo eventually catches them, and kicks Kevin out of the house.

Six months after the accident, Vinny is ready to have the halo removed. He chooses to endure the pain of having the screws removed without taking any sedatives.

In his comeback match, it is confirmed that Vinny will fight against Durán. The fight is held in Las Vegas, in 1990. In the first six rounds, Vinny is overpowered by Durán. Then suddenly — inspired by his own tenacity — Vinny lands a good punch late in the fight. Vinny eventually wins, via 12-round majority decision.

In the final scene, Vinny is interviewed by a journalist. She asks him about the biggest lie he was ever told as a boxer. Vinny pauses, then says the biggest lie is, "It's not that simple".

Cast
 Miles Teller as Vincenzo "Vinny The Pazmanian Devil" Pazienza
 Aaron Eckhart as Kevin Rooney
 Katey Sagal as Louise Pazienza
 Ciarán Hinds as Angelo Pazienza
 Ted Levine as Lou Duva
 Jordan Gelber as Dan Duva
 Daniel Sauli as Jon
 Amanda Clayton as Doreen Pazienza
 Christine Evangelista as Ashley (girlfriend at first fight)
 Tina Casciani as Heather (girlfriend Paz brings to family dinner)
 Liz Carey as Charity (girlfriend freaked out by Halo)
 Denise Schaefer as Leigh
 Joe Jafo Carriere as Cebol

Professional boxers Peter Quillin, Jean-Pierre Augustin and Edwin Rodríguez appear as fighters Roger Mayweather, Gilbert Dele and Roberto Durán, respectively, while Godsmack singer Sully Erna plays a Blackjack dealer at Caesars Palace.

Production 
In September 2010, it was announced Angelo Pizzo had signed on to write the film, with Chad A. Verdi, Noah Kraft, and Glen Ciano producing while Michael Corrente would direct the film. In 2011 Verdi sent Kraft to meet with Martin Scorsese after an introduction from Senator Sheldon Whitehouse.  Mr. Scorsese agreed to partner with Verdi and Kraft on the project and signed on as an executive producer. In 2012, Verdi and Kraft hired Ben Younger to write and direct the feature.

In September 2014, it was announced that Miles Teller, Aaron Eckhart, Amanda Clayton, Ciarán Hinds, and Katey Sagal had joined the cast of the film, with Ben Younger directing from a screenplay he wrote, while Scorsese and Emma Koskoff Tillinger, Bruce Cohen and Pamela Thur-Weir serving as producers. In December 2014, Tina Casciani joined the cast of the film. Aaron Eckhart gained a reported 45 pounds for the role of Kevin Rooney.

Teller trained for 5 months with nutritionist Gary Kobat and trainer Darrell Foster to get in shape for the role of Vinny Paz.

Filming 
On November 10, 2014, filming started in Warwick, Rhode Island. On December 10, filming took place at Twin River Casino in Lincoln, Rhode Island. On December 16 and 17, filming took place at Dunkin' Donuts Center in Providence.

Lawsuit
On July 27, 2017, Vinny Paz filed a formal lawsuit against filmmakers Ben Younger and Chad A. Verdi, citing forgery and failure to pay $175,000 of the promised $300,000 payout for the rights to his life's story. It was dismissed on December 7 of the same year.

Release
In February 2015, the first image of Teller was released. In May 2015, Open Road Films acquired distribution rights to the film. The film had its world premiere at the 43rd Annual Telluride Film Festival on September 2, 2016, before screening at the 2016 Toronto International Film Festival. Originally, the film was scheduled to open in a limited release on November 4, 2016, before opening wide on November 23. In October 2016, the film was rescheduled to have a wide opening on November 18, 2016, forgoing a limited release.

Box office
Bleed for This opened alongside Fantastic Beasts and Where to Find Them and The Edge of Seventeen, as well as the wide expansions of Moonlight and Billy Lynn's Long Halftime Walk, and was initially expected to gross around $5 million from 1,549 theaters. After grossing less than $900,000 on its opening day expectations were lowered to $2–3 million; it ended up debuting to $2.4 million, finishing 8th at the box office. In its second weekend the film dropped to 17th at the box office, grossing $949,898 (a drop of 59%).

Critical response

On Rotten Tomatoes the film holds an approval rating of 70% based on 145 reviews, with an average rating of 6.23/10. The website's critical consensus reads, "Bleed for This rises on the strength of Miles Teller's starring performance to deliver a solid fact-based boxing drama that takes a few genre clichés on the chin but keeps on coming." On Metacritic the film has a weighted average score of 62 out of 100, based on 34 critics, indicating "generally favorable reviews". Audiences polled by CinemaScore gave the film an average grade of "A−" on an A+ to F scale.

Richard Roeper of the Chicago Sun-Times wrote: "Miles Teller gives the performance of his career as the indefatigable Vinny “The Pazmanian Devil” Pazienza, and writer-director Ben Younger delivers one of the best boxing movies of the decade in Bleed for This."
Peter Debruge of Variety wrote: "Teller is terrific, which should come as no surprise to Whiplash fans, though no less significant, the film represents a significant return for writer-director Ben Younger."

TheWrap.com's Claudia Puig wrote: "The boxing drama Bleed for This has a powerful story and a strong lead performance in its corner, but falls short of knockout status. Hampered by clichéd writing and stereotypical portrayals, this extraordinary true-life account feels run-of-the-mill."

References

External links 
 
 
 
 

2016 films
2010s biographical films
2016 independent films
Films set in 1988
Films set in 1990
American biographical films
American boxing films
American independent films
Films directed by Ben Younger
Films set in the Las Vegas Valley
Films set in Rhode Island
Films shot in Rhode Island
Open Road Films films
Biographical films about sportspeople
Cultural depictions of boxers
2010s English-language films
Films produced by Bruce Cohen
2010s American films